On 9 March 2019, a mass shooting occurred in La Playa Men's Club, a nightclub in Salamanca, Guanajuato, Mexico. Fifteen people were killed, and five to seven people were injured. Fourteen victims were later identified as Jalisco New Generation Cartel members. Witnesses described the attackers as a group of armed men who arrived in three vans.

The Mexican government later alleged that the attackers were part of the Santa Rosa de Lima Cartel and announced that they had identified several individual attackers. Five days before the shooting took place, an operation was launched by the Mexican government to crack down on this cartel. Two days after the shooting took place, the Santa Rosa de Lima cartel posted on Twitter that an CJNG member known as Julio, aka "El Trompas," was the main perpetrator of the shootings.

Aftermath
On 24 March 2019, local Santa Rosa de Lima cartel leader Agustin Medina Soto was arrested. On 16 July 2019, it was revealed that all of the remaining resources of the Santa Rosa de Lima cartel, as well as the property of its leader José Antonio Yépez Ortiz (alias “El Marro”), were seized by Mexican authorities. Blocked accounts held by Yépez and people linked to him contain a total of nearly 35.5 million pesos (US$1.85 million).

References

2019 mass shootings in Mexico
2019 murders in Mexico
21st-century mass murder in Mexico
Attacks on buildings and structures in Mexico
Attacks on nightclubs
History of Guanajuato
March 2019 crimes in North America
March 2019 events in Mexico
Mass murder in 2019
Massacres in Mexico
Violent non-state actor incidents in Mexico
Attacks in Mexico in 2019